Xperi Inc. (formerly Tessera Holding Corporation; formerly Xperi Holding Corporation) is an American technology company that licenses technology and intellectual property in areas such as mobile computing, communications, memory and data storage, and three-dimensional integrated circuit (3D IC) technologies, among others. Markets include semiconductor packaging and interconnect solutions, mobile, computational imaging, audio and automotive. Tessera, a former subsidiary of Xperi, has licensed its chip packaging technology to numerous semiconductor manufacturers, including Intel and Samsung Electronics.

As the company evolved, it expanded business through the formation of Invensas, an innovator in next-generation semiconductor and packaging technologies. The company continues to grow and expand through numerous acquisitions: FotoNation, which specializes in image and video enhancement and analysis; Ziptronix, which specializes in three-dimensional integrated circuit technologies; DTS, Inc., an audio technologies company; and assets acquisition from Pelican Imaging.

On December 19, 2019, Xperi and TiVo Corporation announced their intent to merge. The surviving entity operates under the Xperi Holding Corporation name, and became one of the largest licensing companies in the world. The merger was completed on June 1, 2020. Xperi Corporation was reconfigured as a subsidiary of the combined company.

History

Tessera was founded in 1990 by former IBM research scientists.

Some company milestones are listed below:
 1994: Hitachi and Shinko Electric Industries Ltd. license Tessera technologies
 2005: Samsung licenses Tessera technologies
 2005: Acquired assets of Shellcase MVP
 2006: Acquired DigitalOptics Corporation
 2007 Acquired Eyesquad
 2008: Acquired FotoNation
 2009: Won International Trade Commission ruling against Motorola, Qualcomm, Freescale Semiconductor and Spansion in May 
 2011: Founded Invensas Corporation
 November 2011: Samsung extends 2005 license agreement with Tessera
 2013: Sold Micro-Optics business
 2013: Closed leased manufacturing facility in Zhuhai, China, and consolidated manufacturing capabilities in Taiwan 
 2014: Announced cessation of mems | cam manufacturing operations 
 2015 Acquired Ziptronix 
 November 2016: Acquired assets from Pelican Imaging 
 December 2016: Acquired DTS, Inc.
February 2017: Tessera Holding Corporation became Xperi Corporation.
March 2020: Xperi Corporation spins off smart device chip company Perceive
June 2020: Xperi Corporation and TiVo Corporation merged
 May 2021: TiVo Corporation, wholly owned subsidiary of Xperi Holding Corporation, agrees to acquire MobiTV assets from Chapter 11 bankruptcy
 July 2022: Xperi Corporation acquired Vewd Software.
 October 2022: Xperi Holdings Corp. was renamed as Adeia Inc. and spun off Xperi Inc. Xperi Inc. will continue with its core technology operations whilst Adeia Inc. will lead the intellectual property licensing side of the business.

References

External links

 
American companies established in 1990
Technology companies established in 1990
Technology companies of the United States
Fabless semiconductor companies
Companies listed on the Nasdaq
Semiconductor companies of the United States
Manufacturing companies based in San Jose, California
Technology companies based in the San Francisco Bay Area